Marguerite Pagès-Marinier (1725-1786), was a French journalist and editor. She was the director and chief editor of the Annonces, affiches et avis divers de Montpellier of Montpellier in 1770–1776.

References 

1725 births
1786 deaths
18th-century French women writers
18th-century French journalists
18th-century French newspaper publishers (people)
18th-century French businesswomen
18th-century women journalists